Juventud La Palma is a Peruvian football club, playing in the city of Huacho, Peru.
The club was founded on September 7, 1950.

History
The club was 1978 Copa Perú champion, when defeated Pesca Peru of Mollendo, Universidad Técnica de Cajamarca, Asociación Deportiva Tarma, José Carlos Mariátegui of Ica and Deportivo Aviación of Iquitos.

The club have played at the highest level of Peruvian football on seven occasions, from 1979 Torneo Descentralizado until 1980 Torneo Descentralizado, and 1984 Torneo Descentralizado until 1987 Torneo Descentralizado when was relegated.

Honours

National
Peruvian Segunda División:
Winners (1): 1981
Runner-up (3): 1983, 1988, 1989

Copa Perú:
Winners (1): 1978
Runner-up (2): 1977, 1981

Regional
Liga Departamental de Lima:
Winners (2): 1972, 1976
Runner-up (1): 1974

Liga Distrital de Huacho:
Winners (4): 1971, 1972, 1974, 2012
Runner-up (1): 2015

Notable players

 Enrique Bravo
 José "Caté" Carranza
 Miguel Angel Dietz Calderon
 Martín Duffooó
 Gustavo Durán
 Luis Farromeque
 Jaime Herbozo
 Darío "Chacal" Herrera
 William Huapaya
 Héctor La Torre
 Javier Lovera

 Rodulfo Manzo
 Pedro "Viroco" Meza
 Walter Minetto
 Freddy Pacherres
 Alfonso Pando
 Gustavo Pimentel
 Enrique Quintana
 Jorge "Coco" Ramírez
 Wilson Ramírez
 William Vidarte

See also
List of football clubs in Peru
Peruvian football league system

External links
Juventud La Palma
Perú 1979
Perú 1986

Football clubs in Peru